Perley is a city in Norman County, Minnesota, United States. The population was 113 at the 2020 census.

History
A post office called Perley has been in operation since 1885. The city was named for George Edmund Perley, a local attorney.

Geography

Demographics

As of 2000, the median income for a household in the city was $31,250, and the median income for a family was $35,625. Males had a median income of $21,528 versus $19,063 for females. The per capita income for the city was $13,998. There were 10.5% of families and 12.2% of the population living below the poverty line, including 23.7% of under eighteens and none of those over 64.

2010 census
As of the census of 2010, there were 92 people, 48 households, and 28 families residing in the city. The racial makeup of the city was 93.5% White, 1.1% Native American, 3.3% from other races, and 2.2% from two or more races. Hispanic or Latino of any race were 7.6% of the population.

There were 48 households, of which 16.7% had children under the age of 18 living with them, 50.0% were married couples living together, 6.3% had a female householder with no husband present, 2.1% had a male householder with no wife present, and 41.7% were non-families. 39.6% of all households were made up of individuals, and 6.3% had someone living alone who was 65 years of age or older. The average household size was 1.92 and the average family size was 2.50.

The median age in the city was 48 years. 15.2% of residents were under the age of 18; 4.3% were between the ages of 18 and 24; 22.8% were from 25 to 44; 39.2% were from 45 to 64; and 18.5% were 65 years of age or older. The gender makeup of the city was 52.2% male and 47.8% female.

References

Cities in Norman County, Minnesota
Cities in Minnesota